Tahlia Meyer (born 6 July 1995) is an Australian rules footballer who plays for the Gold Coast in the AFL Women's (AFLW). She has previously played for St Kilda. She was signed by St Kilda as an undrafted free agent selection in October 2020.

Pre-AFLW career
Meyer began her footballing career with the Morphettville Park Football Club in the southern suburbs of Adelaide. After playing with the Norwood Football Club, she then played for the South Adelaide Football Club in the SANFL Women's League. After a breakout 2020 season, she was named in the SANFLW Team of the Year on the wing.

AFLW career
Meyer debuted for St Kilda in the opening round of the 2021 AFL Women's season. On debut, Meyer collected just 6 disposals, and was omitted from the team for round 2. She was brought back into the team in round 4, and kept her place for the rest of the season. It was revealed that Meyer had signed on with the Saints for one year on 29 June 2021, tying her to the club until the end of the 2022 season. In May 2022, Meyer was delisted by St Kilda. In June 2022, Meyer was signed by Gold Coast as a delisted free agent.

Statistics
Statistics are correct to the end of the 2021 season.

|- style="background-color: #eaeaea"
! scope="row" style="text-align:center" | 2021
|style="text-align:center;"|
| 34 || 7 || 0 || 1 || 44 || 24 || 68 || 13 || 14 || 0.0 || 0.1 || 6.3 || 3.4 || 9.7 || 1.9 || 2.0 || 0
|- 
|- class="sortbottom"
! colspan=3| Career
! 7
! 0
! 1
! 44
! 24
! 68
! 13
! 14
! 0.0
! 0.1
! 6.3
! 3.4
! 9.7
! 1.9
! 2.0
! 0
|}

References

1995 births
Living people
St Kilda Football Club (AFLW) players
South Adelaide Football Club players (Women's)
Australian rules footballers from South Australia